Narcoworld: Dope Stories is a 2019 documentary web television series. The premise revolves around global drug trade, told from both the drug trade and law enforcement side.

Cast 
 Michael Beach	as Narrator

Release 
Narcoworld: Dope Stories was released on November 22, 2019, on Netflix.

References

External links
 
 

2019 American television series debuts
2010s American documentary television series
English-language Netflix original programming
Netflix original documentary television series
Works about Mexican drug cartels
Television series by Warner Bros. Television Studios